Love Machine may refer to:

Music
 The Love Machine (album), 2001, by Sandra Bernhard
 Love Machine (album), 1991, by Brighton Rock
 We Love Machine (album), 2009, by Way Out West

Songs
"The Love Machine" (Elvis Presley song), 1967
"Love Machine" (The Miracles song), 1975
"Love Machine" (Morning Musume song), 1999
"Love Machine" (Girls Aloud song), 2004
"Love Machine", a 1968 song by The O'Kaysions
"Love Machine", a 1971 song by Uriah Heep from the album Look at Yourself
"Lovemachine", a 1978 song by Supermax from the album World of Today
"L.O.V.E. Machine", a 1984 song by W.A.S.P. from the album W.A.S.P.
"Love Machine", a 2007 song by Melissa Mars
"Love Machine", a 1990 song by The Time from the soundtrack album Graffiti Bridge
"Luv Machine", a 1998 song by Blonde Redhead from the album In an Expression of the Inexpressible

Other uses
 Art Barr (1966–1994), American professional wrestler who wrestled in Mexico as "The American Love Machine" and "The Love Machine"
 The Love Machine (novel), a 1969 novel by Jacqueline Susann
 The Love Machine (film), a 1971 adaptation of the novel
 The Love Machine (TV series), British dating show
 Love Machine, 1970s British dance troupe known from The Benny Hill Show
 "Love Machine", television series episode of Haven
 Love Machine, animated film character from Summer Wars

See also
Love tester machine

ang:Love Machine (sang)